Castle Howe is a motte and bailey castle in the town of Kendal, England.

History 

Castle Howe was built after the Norman conquest of England, either in 1087 by the Norman nobleman Ivo Taillebois, or by the nobleman Ketel some time after 1100. The castle was designed as a motte and bailey fortification, with a circular motte 11 m high and 48 m wide at the base, and a curved bailey hugging the ridge alongside it.

The castle was abandoned in the 12th century, either by one Gilbert, or by William de Lancaster. The bailey was later destroyed when the area was turned into a park. The remaining earthworks are maintained South Lakeland District Council, with information boards placed at the foot of the motte.

See also 
Castles in Great Britain and Ireland
List of castles in England

References 

Castles in Cumbria
Kendal
Scheduled monuments in Cumbria